Mickey Smith may refer to:

 Mickey Smith, a character from Doctor Who
 Mickey Smith (artist), American photographer and conceptual artist

See also
 Michael Smith (disambiguation)